Herbert Laabs (born 24 October 1950) is an East German sprint canoeist who competed in the early to mid-1970s. He won four medals at the ICF Canoe Sprint World Championships with a gold (K-4 1000 m: 1974), two silvers (K-2 500 m and K-4 1000 m: both 1975), and two bronzes (K-2 500 m and K-2 1000 m: 1973).

Laabs also competed in the K-4 1000 m event at the 1972 Summer Olympics in Munich, but was eliminated in the semifinals.

References

1950 births
Canoeists at the 1972 Summer Olympics
German male canoeists
Living people
Olympic canoeists of East Germany
ICF Canoe Sprint World Championships medalists in kayak